The County of Trastámara (Spanish Condado de Trastámara) was a tenancy of the crown in the Kingdom of Galicia in the Middle Ages. Its name comes from the Latin tra(n)s Tamar(is), meaning "beyond [north of] the Tambre", a river which runs through Galicia. It was regularly granted to men of a single family, the House of Traba from the 11th century into the 13th, after which it was often given for life to others, including Alvar Núñez Osorio and the future King Henry II of Castile, whose dynasty is thus known as the House of Trastámara. On 4February 1445 in San Martín de Valdeiglesias, it was granted as a hereditary possession to Pedro Álvarez Osorio by Juan II of Castile.

Counts

House of Traba
Froila Bermúdez de Traba (d. 1091)
Pedro Fróilaz de Traba (r. 11251126, d. 1128), son of prec.
Fernando Pérez de Traba (r. 1132–1145, d. 1155), son of prec.
Gonzalo Fernández de Traba (r. 1155–1159, d. 1165), son of Fernando Pérez
Fernando González de Traba (r. 1161–1165, d. 1165), son of prec.
Bermudo Pérez de Traba (d. 1168), son of Pedro Fróilaz
Gómez González de Traba (r. 1165–1208, d. c. 1211), son of Gonzalo Fernández
Rodrigo Gómez de Traba (r. c.1220–c.1260, d. c. 1261), son of prec.

House of Osorio
Pedro Álvarez Osorio, I Count of Trastámara;
Álvaro Pérez Osorio, II Count of Trastámara (I marqués de Astorga);
Pedro Álvarez Osorio, III Count of Trastámara;
Álvaro Pérez Osorio, IV Count of Trastámara;
Pedro Álvarez Osorio, V Count of Trastámara;
Álvar Pérez Osorio, VI Count of Trastámara;
Antonio Pedro Álvarez Osorio, VII Count of Trastámara;
Alfonso Pérez Osorio Velasco y Herrera, VIII Count of Trastámara;
Pedro Álvarez Osorio, IX Count of Trastámara;
Álvar Pérez Osorio, X Count of Trastámara;
Antonio Pedro Sancho Dávila y Osorio, XI Count of Trastámara;
Ana Dávila y Osorio, XII Countessa of Trastámara;
Melchor de Guzmán y Osorio, XIII Count of Trastámara;
Ana de Guzmán Osorio y Dávila, XIV Countessa of Trastámara;
Ventura Osorio de Moscoso y Guzmán Dávila y Aragón, XV Count of Trastámara;

Counts of Spain
Spanish noble titles
1445 establishments in Europe
15th-century establishments in Castile